Martin Ulvestad (24  December 1865 – 19 January 1942) was a Norwegian-born American historian and author whose writings focused on Norwegian-American immigration. He was a pioneer in documenting the early history of Norwegian settlers in America.

Biography
Ole Johannes Martinus Ulvestad was born at Volda municipality in Møre og Romsdal, Norway.  He was the son of Peder Olsen Ulvestad (1825–1918) and Alexandrine Knudsdatter (1824–1894). He immigrated to the United States in 1886. During his  next three to four years,  he worked as a book printer and as a typesetter for various English, German and Scandinavian language newspapers.

Ulvestad  published an English-Danish-Norwegian dictionary in 1895. Ulvestad subsequently collected and published extensive information regarding Norwegian-American immigration and settlement in North America. His books provided biographical information, history of the settlements associated with Norwegian immigration and information regarding those who fought in the American Civil War. These books also contained articles about Norwegian music in America, listing of newspapers and magazines, and Norwegian-American educational institutions. His most notable work was the two volume Nordmaendene i Amerika  published in 1907 and 1913.  The narrative portion of Nordmændene i Amerika was subsequently translated into English by Olaf Kringhaug (1928–2008).

Personal life
In 1915,  Martin Ulvestad was  honorary vice president of the Norwegian American exhibition at the  Panama Pacific Exposition in San Francisco, California. Ulestad was presented with the Knight's Cross, First Class, of the Royal Norwegian Order of St. Olav, for his dedicated work in collecting and publishing these material. Ulvestad was knighted by Haakon VII of Norway with the Order of St. Olav in 1923.

In 1893, Ulvestad married Gertrude Myklebust (1861-1900) who had also immigrated from  Norway They had one son. After her death,  Ulvestad remarried in 1901 with her cousin Hannah Oss  who was also a Norwegian immigrant.  They had six children. Martin Ulvestad died during 1942 in Seattle, Washington.

Selected bibliography
Engelsk-Dansk-Norsk Ordbog med fuldstændig Udtalebetegnelse (1895)
Nordmaendene i Amerika: Deres Historie og Rekord (1907)
Nordmaendene I Amerika, 2den Del (1913)
Norsk-Amerikaneren (1930)

References

External links
Nordmændene i Amerika (Statsarkivet i Bergen/Universitetsbiblioteket i Bergen)
Portrait of Martin Ulvestad by Yngvar Sonnichsen
The Papers of Martin Ulvestad (Luther College)

1865 births
1942 deaths
People from Volda
Norwegian emigrants to the United States
American non-fiction writers
American lexicographers
Norwegian lexicographers
Recipients of the St. Olav's Medal